Bedok Green Secondary School (BGSS) is a co-educational government secondary school in Bedok, Singapore. It is within walking distance from Bedok Reservoir MRT station.

History 
BGSS was founded in January 2001. It was at a temporary holding site at 2 Bedok South Road before it moved to its current location on 31 December 2002.

The number of staff in the school has increased from 14 at the school's first opening to 139 in 2015, while pupil enrolment was about 1,100 in 2015.

BGSS was officially opened on 4 July 2003 by Raymond Lim, Member of Parliament for East Coast GRC. Its campus consists of six blocks around a garden, a multi-purpose hall, seven computer labs (including an iPad lab), six science labs, two design and technology workshops, two kitchens, a canteen, a library, a dance studio, a music room, a drama Black Box, about 40 classrooms, a synthetic field, and a Pupil Activity Centre (PAC). There is a parade square, where students gather every morning for the flag-raising ceremony.

References

Secondary schools in Singapore